The McConnell State Recreation Area is on the banks of the Merced River, about two miles northeast of Livingston (on U.S. Route 99 between Turlock and Merced). Fishing is popular for catfish, black bass and perch. There are picnic, camping and play areas.

Proposed for closure
The McConnell State Recreation Area was one of the 48 California state parks proposed for closure in January 2008 by California's Governor Arnold Schwarzenegger as part of a deficit reduction program.

References

External links
Official web page
Virtual Guidebook page with panoramic image

California State Recreation Areas
Merced River
Parks in Merced County, California
Parks in the San Joaquin Valley